The Mercedes-Benz C291 was a sports-prototype racing car introduced for the 1991 World Sportscar Championship season. It was Mercedes-Benz’ final car in the Group C category.

Introduction
The 1991 season marked the introduction of the FIA’s new, and controversial, 3.5 litre formula which replaced the highly successful Group C category that had been used in the World Sportscar Championship since 1982, though due to a small number of entries for the 3.5 litre formula heavily penalised Group C cars (which were subject to weight penalties and started behind the new-style C1 entries on the grid) were allowed to participate in the season's C2 category.

To meet the new regulations Mercedes-Benz came up with an all-new car; the C291 which was designed by its racing partner Sauber.

One survived and is on display in the Carl Benz Museum in Ladenburg, Germany. Another one is located in the Michael Schumacher Collection in Cologne, and this is the Autopolis-winning chassis.

Engine
The primary feature of the new regulations was the use of a 3.5 litre naturally aspirated engine. This made it impossible for Mercedes-Benz to use the engines from its previous Group C cars. Also, to produce similar power to the Group C cars a 3.5 litre naturally aspirated engine had to be very high-revving and be constructed from different materials in order to rev highly.

Unlike Jaguar's XJR-14 who had the readily available and proven Ford HB V8 engine from the Benetton B190B Formula One car (the engine regulations for the new 3.5 litre formula were identical to Formula One), Mercedes-Benz had to design an all-new purpose-built racing engine and its M-291 3.5L Flat-12 unit was the result. The engine produced about   compared to about  produced by 5.0 litre V8 twin turbo found in the C291's predecessor, the Mercedes-Benz C11.

Design
Unlike the Jaguar XJR-14, the C291 resembled previous sports-prototypes, despite the fact that the redesign of the Le Mans Circuit de la Sarthe in 1990 meant cars with their low drag design, top-end power, straight-line acceleration and top-speed characteristics were no longer required. Unlike the Jaguar (and latterly the Peugeot 905B) the Mercedes still featured a full width low-drag single-tier rear wing and no front wing. This resulted in the car having a higher top speed than the Jaguar (and only slightly less than old Group C cars).

Overall the C291 was not as fast as a contemporary Formula One car around some circuits used by the Grand Prix fraternity, and was a lot slower at Le Mans' Circuit de la Sarthe in 1991.

Race results
During the development and testing of the new M291 powerplant, it became apparent to Sauber Mercedes that there were problems in the engine design and construction. Thus the team started the 1991 season with a lone C291, while at the same time running an older C11. In the first two races of the season, the C291 failed to finish while the C11 finished 2nd and 3rd. At the third race, the C291 scored a 2nd-place finish, ahead of the C11. For the fourth round, the 1991 24 Hours of Le Mans, the team decided that the C291 would not be capable of completing the race, and thus were forced to enter three C11s.

After Le Mans, Sauber Mercedes decided that the C291 had been developed enough to compete on its own, and it finished the season without running a C11 alongside. However, the C291 failed to finish the next three races of the season. Only in the final race of the year at Autopolis was the C291 not only able to finish, but also able to score its only win. Sauber Mercedes finished the season third in the teams championship.

After much disappointment the C291 was planned to be replaced by the more radical C292 for the 1992 season, but Mercedes-Benz decided to pull out of sportscar racing before the C292 could compete and turned to Formula 1 in 1993, although it did not continue to use the troublesome M291 powerplant.

Complete World Sportscar Championship results

References 

Group C cars
C291
Sauber Motorsport